The Obnora is a river in Vologda and Yaroslavl Oblasts of Russia. It is a right tributary of the Kostroma.

The town of Lyubim is situated by the Obnora.

References 

Rivers of Vologda Oblast
Rivers of Yaroslavl Oblast